The Helsinki Regional Transport Authority is the inter-municipal authority that maintains the public transportation network of the nine municipalities of Greater Helsinki, Finland. 
 
HSL oversees the operation of all of Helsinki's public transportation. The system consists of local buses, trams, metro trains, ferries, commuter trains, and bikeshare.

Apart from four electric buses, HSL does not own rolling stock. Due to this, HSL relies on third-party contractors for the day-to-day operation of the transit system.

History

Founding 
HSL was founded on 1 January 2010 on the basis of the Finnish public transportation law, joukkoliikennelaki, which was adopted on 3 December 2009. According to joukkoliikennelaki, HSL is responsible for the planning of public transportation in Greater Helsinki. The traffic functions of the inter-municipal Helsinki Metropolitan Area Council (YTV) and planning, procuring and tendering functions of Helsinki City Transport (HKL, within the city of Helsinki) were moved into the transport authority.

When it was founded, HSL had a revenue of over €500 million and approximately 350 employees.

Digitransit 
In 2016, HSL started to develop a revamped version of its native journey planner, Reittiopas, originally released by YTV in 2001. The replacement intermodal public transport route planner named as Digitransit is built on open source OpenTripPlanner.

In February 2017, the new route planner was opened for public use, and the phasing-out of Reittiopas Classic began.

Name

The official name of the transport authority is Helsingin seudun liikenne -kuntayhtymä HSL in Finnish and Samkommunen Helsingforsregionens trafik HRT in Swedish. The official name of HSL in English is Helsinki Regional Transport Authority. Also the shorter form of the name, Helsinki Region Transport (HSL) may be used in everyday use.

Transportation 
HSL oversees the operation of all public transportation in the Helsinki region. However, apart from select bus routes with electric units, the agency does not operate any rolling stock. Therefore, it relies mainly on independent contractors for the operation of the network.

Metro 

The Helsinki Metro is operated by HKL. The metro line opened in 1982. The system serves 25 stations in total on its two lines, M1 and M2.

Länsimetro 
The first phase of the Länsimetro expansion program extended the metro lines west to Lauttasaari and southern Espoo, serving eight new stations. The second phase of the extension is slated to open in 2023. At that time, the total number of metro stations on the line will increase from 25 to 30.

Commuter rail 

Commuter rail service in the region is operated by VR. There are 52 stations in the network, which are served by 15 lines. Out of HSL's three rail networks, commuter rail is the most far-reaching; it serves the northern, north-eastern, and western suburbs of the city, as well as Helsinki Airport in Vantaa.

Trams 

Trams in Helsinki are operated by HKL. Helsinki was the only Finnish city with tram service in use from 1972, when tram services in Turku ended, until 2021, when the Tampere light rail was opened. Tram service in Helsinki began in 1891.

Buses 
HSL offers three types of bus service: standard buses, neighbourhood buses and nine small headway crosstown lines ("runkolinja", literally: trunk lines).

HSL tickets are also valid on most U-routes which are run by separate companies and serve cities outside of the HSL area.

Standard bus routes 
The standard bus routes can be divided into the following categories:

 Helsinki internal bus routes
 20-23: buses serving the central area
 37-43: buses leaving from Kamppi or Elielinaukio and serving the areas of Haaga and Kannelmäki
 50-69: crosstown lines, usually going from eastern or northern Helsinki to Elielinaukio, Kamppi or Rautatientori
 70-79: buses serving the Malmi area
 80-98: eastern metro connection buses
 80-89: buses serving areas near Herttoniemi
 90-98: buses serving areas near Itäkeskus, Myllypuro, Kontula, Mellunmäki, Rastila and Vuosaari
 Espoo internal bus routes
 Vantaa internal bus routes
 Regional routes within the HSL area
 111-739: these buses have a basic numbering system with the smaller numbers mostly going west towards Espoo, the larger numbers mostly going north-east towards Vantaa and the some 500-series buses being cross-city routes

The numbers listed above have exceptions (e.g. Helsinki internal school bus route 91 which serves the Östersundom area).

Neighbourhood bus routes 
The neighbourhood lines use mini-buses which stop anywhere on the line at a passenger's request. These lines often run hourly from morning to afternoon on weekdays and have little to no service on weekends. The lines are mostly meant to be used by people with difficulties moving but they can be used by all people.

Trunk routes 
There are nine orange colour-coded cross-city lines which are called trunk lines are routes 20, 30, 40, 200, 500, 510, 550, 560 and 570. 550 runs from the Itäkeskus metro station in the east, through the Oulunkylä, Huopalahti, Pitäjänmäki, Mäkkylä and Leppävaara commuter train stations and the western metro stations of Aalto university and Tapiola, terminating at Westendinasema in the west. 560 runs from Rastila metro station in the east, through the Vuosaari, Mellunmäki and Kontula metro stations and the Malmi and Myyrmäki commuter train stations terminating in Honkasuo in the north. Route 20 runs from Eira in the south to Munkkivuori. It runs around entire Munkkivuori and stops also in Talinranta. Route 30 runs from Eira to Honkasuo (Myyrmäki) via Pitäjänmäki, Malminkartano and Myyrmäki railway stations. Routes 20 and 30 run on the same route from Eira to Munkkivuori through Kamppi metro station. Route 40 runs from Elielinaukio next to the Helsinki central railway station to Kannelmäki and route 200 from Elielinaukio to Espoo center through the railway stations of Pitäjänmäki, Mäkkylä and Leppävaara.
Route 500 runs from Itäkeskus to Munkkivuori and route 510 from Herttoniemi metro station to Westendinasema through the western metro stations Aalto University and Tapiola. Routes 500 and 510 run on the same route from Herttoniemi to Munkkiniemi through the metro stations of Kulosaari and Kalasatama and the Pasila railway station. Route 570 runs from Mellunmäki metro station in the east through the Tikkurila railway station to the Helsinki airport
 
Routes 200, 500, 510, 550, 560 and 570 use long wheel-base buses which have a high capacity and are colour-coded orange instead of the regular blue colour-coding on buses. Routes 20, 30 and 40 use usually new electric articulated buses that are orange as well. The trunk lines don't stop at every bus stop.

Buses on the route 550 run every 4–10 minutes between 4:20 and 21:30 and every 15–30 minutes between 21:30 and 1:00 on weekdays with buses running every 10 minutes between 10:00 and 19:00 and every 15–30 minutes between 4:50 and 10:00 and between 19:00 and 1:00 on Saturdays, and every 10 minutes between 10:00 and 19:00 and every 15–30 minutes between 5:20 and 10:00 and between 19:00 and 1:00 on Sundays.

Buses on the route 560 run every 7–10 minutes between 5:15 and 20:30 and every 15–30 minutes between 4:30 and 5:15 and between 20:30 and 0:30 with buses running every 10 minutes between 11:00 and 18:30 and every 15–30 minutes between 5:00 and 11:00 and between 18:30 and 0:30 on Saturdays, and every 15 minutes between 11:00 and 20:30 and every 20–30 minutes between 5:30 and 11:00 and between 20:30 and 24:00 on Sundays.

A plan to build a light-rail connection from Itäkeskus to Keilaniemi following the current route of bus route 550 has been finalised and accepted by the cities of Helsinki and Espoo. Construction is set to start in 2019.

The light-rail will have a track gauge of 1000mm which is the same as on the Helsinki tram system. The vehicles would be larger versions of the current Helsinki trams and would be built by Finnish company Transtech.

The first trunk line 550 started operating in 2006 when it was known as the "Jokeri" (joker) line. In 2013 it became the first trunk line. 560 began operating in 2015. Routes 500 and 510 were opened in 2019 and they replaced the lines 58 and 551. Route 200 was opened in 2020 and it replaced the line 235. Routes 20, 30, 40 and 570 were opened in 2021 and they replaced the lines 14, 18, 39 and 562. Routes 550, 560 and 570 are operated by Helsingin bussiliikenne. Route 500 is operated by Pohjolan Liikenne. Other trunk lines are operated by Nobina Finland.

Bus operators 
Bus services are divided among multiple operators. The companies granted with traffic contracts as of 2020 are:
 Nobina
 Pohjolan Liikenne
 Helsingin Bussiliikenne
 Savonlinja
 Tammelundin Liikenne
 Åbergin Linja
 Korsisaari
 Taksikuljetus
 Reissu-Ruoti
 Tilausliikenne Nikkanen
 V-S Bussipalvelut

Ferry 
A ferry to Suomenlinna is part of the HSL network. This route is operated on two ferries, Suokki and Suomenlinna II.

Bikeshare 

In 2016 HSL launched Helsinki's bikeshare program. Starting on 2 May 2016, users could register to use the network for a day fee of €5, a week fee of €10 or the entire season from May to the end of October for €25. The initial network included 500 bikes, one of which a user could use to travel from any of the 50 stations to another.

The bikeshare system is a joint venture between CityBike Finland, HKL, and HSL. The system is sponsored by HOK-Elanto's grocery shop chain Alepa, which has purchased the commercial space on the bicycles. Due to this, the bicycles are colloquially known as alepapyörät (”Alepa bikes”).

In late 2016 HSL announced the details of a revamped bikeshare system, this time spanning 1,500 bikes and 150 stations. The expanded bike program brought the service to Munkkiniemi, Pasila, and Vallila. In addition to having 1,400 bikes and 140 stations in Helsinki, the service covered Matinkylä and Olari in Espoo with 100 bikes and 10 stations. The 2018 season saw a further-expanded network, with a total of 2,200 bikes at 220 stations, of which 70 are located in Espoo. The season fare was increased to €30.

Ticketing 
As of 27 April 2019, the HSL area is divided into four zones designated A, B, C and D, roughly circularly divided according to distance from the city centre of Helsinki. Customers are obligated to buy a ticket spanning at least two zones at a time; the exception to this is zone D, for which a single zone ticket is available. Available tickets include single, day and seasonal tickets, all of which can be bought using a travel card or from HSL's vending machines or mobile application. Additionally, single and day tickets may be bought aboard buses from the driver.

HSL controls the sale and inspection of transit tickets. Apart from the bus network, all of HSL's services use a proof-of-payment system: there are no gates at metro and commuter rail stations or tram stops. Instead, passengers are required to present a valid ticket to fare inspectors, who randomly patrol the network. If caught without a valid ticket, a passenger must pay a fine of €80 in addition to the full price of the ticket.

Zones 
  – spans from the city centre of Helsinki to the districts of Lauttasaari, Etelä-Haaga, Käpylä and Kulosaari
  – the rest of Helsinki, Kauniainen, eastern Espoo and southern Vantaa
  – the Östersundom district of Helsinki, western Espoo and northern Vantaa
  – the town of Kerava and the municipalities of Kirkkonummi, Siuntio, Sipoo and Tuusula
 Travelers traveling between the HSL zone and Järvenpää may also use zone D tickets; the city will become a full member of HSL in 2022.

Organization

HSL is owned by the cities of Helsinki, Espoo, Vantaa, Kerava, and Kauniainen and the municipalities of Kirkkonummi and Sipoo. In 2017, Tuusula and Siuntio voted to join HSL.

The other municipalities in the Greater Helsinki area (Järvenpää, Nurmijärvi, Mäntsälä, Pornainen, Hyvinkää, and Vihti) have the possibility of joining HSL in the future. About 1.3 million people live in the 14 municipalities of Greater Helsinki and the population is estimated to increase to approximately 1.5 million by the year 2030.

HSL's office is located in Opastinsilta 6 A, Helsinki.

Visual identity

After the founding of HSL, the visual identity of all transportation services in Helsinki was unified under one brand name and logo. The HSL identity is heavily based on the color-coding of different elements to highlight the types of information presented; danger is represented in red, optional information in blue.

The visual identity of HSL was created by the design office Kokoro & Moi. The designers have explained the concept as:
"The outlook shows reliability, freshness and ease of approaching. The octagonal shape of the logo is symbolizing the expanding public transportation network. The loops in the logo remind of leaf shoots, telling of new ways of action and new partnerships and of ecological values. The eight loops also represent all cardinal directions and are sending a message of the broad-ranged function of the organization. In the middle of the logo there are two graphical lines, symbolizing uniting organizations and the public transportation with its tracks, wheels and map lines."

Colours
The base colour for HSL is blue (#007AC9). Each of the forms of transit are represented with a colour of its own.

Fonts
Fonts used in HSL brand are Gotham Rounded and Gotham XNarrow. The foremost font type is Gotham Rounded which is present in most of the materials. Gotham XNarrow is used less, mostly in advertisements, quotations, numberings and line listings.

Pictograms
HSL has its own collection of dedicated pictograms which follow the design guidelines.
They also offer a library for the ready-made pictograms that are used both in signposts and on the website as icons without the frame.

Work
HSL's duty is to do its part in taking care of the functioning, economical aspects and caring of nature in greater Helsinki. This goal is achieved by promoting the usage of public transportation and by organizing affordable and well functioning public transportation services.

HSL takes care of planning the regional public transportation and internal public transportation of Helsinki, Espoo and Vantaa. Beside planning, HSL also tenders the bus companies. The organization owns no buses or rail rolling stock.

One of the agency's jobs is to compile the Helsinki Region Transport System Plan.

Criticism

New fare card readers

HSL began installing new fare card readers on public transportation vehicles in 2016. The new reader's interface was considered more difficult to use than the previous one, so HSL was advised to redesign the interface. Most of the criticism focused on the difficulty of using the device's OK button.

At the end of 2016, Yle reported HSL's decision to retain the interface. HSL's project manager, Satu Rönnqvist, explained the decision: "The old fare card readers have had many of these error selections, which result in thousands of compensation claims to HSL each year. These are being attempted to be reduced with this OK button."

In March 2017, Yle reported that HSL was still considering a new fare card reader interface. HSL's customer and sales manager, Mari Flink, said that the company was conducting user tests regarding the ease of use of fare card readers. After these user tests, in the fall of 2017, HSL made the validation of season tickets faster.

Selection of new CEO

HSL's first CEO, Suvi Rihtniemi, retired and on November 3rd, 2020, Mika Nykänen was selected as her successor. Nykänen will come from the position of director of the Geological Survey of Finland and has no previous experience in public transportation. HSL's board voted on the selection and in the election HKL's CEO Ville Lehmuskoski and Nykänen both received seven votes, and the selection was then decided by drawing lots.

The selection of a new CEO in 2020 became politicized a few days before the selection. Mika Nykänen, who was selected for the position, has a long history in the National Coalition Party, and his selection as director of the Geological Survey of Finland has been considered political. Other candidates for the CEO position included HKL's CEO Ville Lehmuskoski, OnniBus.com's founder Pekka Möttö, and other veterans of the public transportation industry.

Requirement for a smartphone and a certain operating system

In the summer of 2021, HSL (Helsinki Regional Transport Authority) decided that starting in 2022, students would only be able to receive discounts on fares purchased through the HSL mobile app. Student status would be automatically verified through the Ministry of Education's Koski service. Students whose information is not found in the Koski service, such as students of folk high schools, would be able to receive discounts on physical fare cards. HSL's decision was appealed to the administrative court, as receiving the student discount would require owning a smartphone if the student's information is found in the Koski service. The appeal also argued that the smartphone and its operating system must be sufficiently new for the HSL app to function. The phone's operating system must be Android or iOS. The Helsinki Administrative Court overturned HSL's decision, stating that students are entitled to receive discounts on physical fare cards in addition to the app. The decision was justified by ensuring equality.

References

External links

Helsinki Regional Transport Authority 
The Reittiopas Journey Planner is being phased out with next generation Digitransit service slated for a 2017 completion.
Mobile Apps based on open data by HSL

Transport in Helsinki
Transport in Vantaa
Transport in Espoo